Cambridge Point is an uninhabited headland on Coburg Island in the Qikiqtaaluk Region of Nunavut, Canada. It is located off Marina Peninsula.

Geography

Conservation
The point is a Canadian Important Bird Area (#NU010). A portion of Cambridge Point is also contained within the Nirjutiqavvik (Coburg Island) National Wildlife Area.

Fauna
The area is frequented by bowhead whale, narwhal, polar bear, seal, walrus, and white whale.

Notable bird species include:
 Black guillemot
 Black-legged kittiwake
 Glaucous gull
 Northern fulmar
 Thick-billed murre

References

 Cambridge Point at the Atlas of Canada

Peninsulas of Qikiqtaaluk Region
Important Bird Areas of Qikiqtaaluk Region
Important Bird Areas of Arctic islands
Seabird colonies